{{DISPLAYTITLE:C10H16N4O3}}
The molecular formula C10H16N4O3 (molar mass: 240.26 g/mol, exact mass: 240.1222 u) may refer to:

 Anserine (β-alanyl-3-methylhistidine)
 Dimetilan